The Fighting Heart is a 1925 American silent drama film directed by John Ford.

Plot
As described in a film magazine review, a young man with an inheritance of alcoholism whips a prize fighter in a street fight but falls from his sweetheart’s graces. He goes to New York City and is beaten in a fight in the ring. Later, he whips the fighter again outside the ring and, having left off drinking, is now accepted by the young woman.

Cast

Preservation
With no prints of The Fighting Heart located in any film archives, it is now considered to be a lost film.

See also
List of lost films

References

External links

1925 films
1925 drama films
1925 lost films
Silent American drama films
American silent feature films
American black-and-white films
Films directed by John Ford
Fox Film films
Lost American films
Lost drama films
1920s American films
1920s English-language films
English-language drama films